Antoine Benoist may refer to:
 Antoine Benoist (painter), French painter and sculptor
 Antoine Benoist (engraver), French draughtsman and engraver
 Antoine Benoist (cyclist), French road and cyclo-cross cyclist